Neosilurus equinus, the southern tandan, is a species of fish in the eeltail catfish family. It occurs in streams in Papua and Papua New Guinea. It can be found in Lake Kutubu.

References

equinus